Selim may refer to:

 Selim I the Ottoman (Turkish) sultan reigned 1512–1520
 Selim II the Ottoman sultan reigned 1566–1574
 Selim III the Ottoman sultan reigned 1789–1807
 Selim I Giray Crimean khan reigned four times between 1671 and 1704
 Selim Giray Turkish violinist borne in 1970